Reagan may refer to:
Reagan, Henderson County, Tennessee
Reagan, McMinn County, Tennessee
Reagantown, Tennessee, in Sevier County
former name for Decatur, Tennessee, in Meigs County